Aphanitoma is a genus of sea snails, marine gastropod mollusks in the family Borsoniidae.

Description
The shell has a fusiform shape. The sinus is scarcely apparent. The biplicate columella is nearly straight. The canal is rather short and slightly curved.

Species
Species within the genus Aphanitoma include:
 Aphanitoma locardi Bavay, 1906
 Aphanitoma mariottinii Smriglio, Rufini & Martin Perez, 2001
 † Aphanitoma targioniana (D'Ancona, 1873) : a little known species from the bathyal malacofauna of the upper Pliocene from Romagna (N-Italy)

References

 Bellardi (1875), Bullettino della Societa malacologica italiana p. 22

External links
  Bouchet, P.; Kantor, Y. I.; Sysoev, A.; Puillandre, N. (2011). A new operational classification of the Conoidea. Journal of Molluscan Studies. 77, 273-308